Mahatma Gandhi Antarrashtriya Hindi Vishwavidyalaya is a central university located in Wardha, Maharashtra, India.

History 
The university began through an Act of Parliament which received the assent of the President on 8 January 1997. The purpose of the act was to establish and incorporate a teaching university for the promotion and development of Hindi language and literature, through teaching and research, with a view to enabling Hindi to achieve greater functional efficiency and recognition as a major international language.

References

External links
 Official website
 Ordinance No 45/2017 Doctor Of Philosophy (Ph.D.)
 Ordinance No 56/2017 Master Of Philosophy (M. Phil) )

Hindi-language education
Central universities in India
Language education in India
Universities in Maharashtra
Wardha district
Educational institutions established in 1997
1997 establishments in Maharashtra